Yuriy Vilyovych Maksymov (born 8 December 1968) is a Ukrainian football coach and a former midfielder. His career achievements saw him inducted into the Viktor Leonenko Hall of Fame in March 2012.

Club career

Born in Kherson, Ukrainian SSR, Soviet Union, Maksymov played for Valery Lobanovsky's Dynamo Kyiv in his native Ukraine.

In November 1997 he moved to Germany joining Bundesliga club Werder Bremen, signing a contract until 2001. He was seen as a replacement for the injured playmaker Andi Herzog. The transfer fee paid to Dynamo Kyiv was reported as DM 3.5 or 3.6 million (€ or  million). Whilst at Werder Bremen he helped them win the 1998–99 DFB-Pokal, starting in the final against Bayern Munich and scoring as the match finished 1–1 before Werder Bremen won on penalties. Having featured sporadically in the 2000–01 season, Maksymov left Werder Bremen for 2. Bundesliga side Waldhof Mannheim on a free transfer in 2001, along with Bernhard Trares. He signed a two-year contract.

He later returned to Russia and Ukraine to finish his career at FC Rostov and FC Metalurh Zaporizhzhya.

International career
Maksymov earned 27 caps playing for the Ukraine national team scoring give goals.

Managerial career
Before taking charge of Obolon Kyiv in June 2008, Maksymov was in charge of CSKA Kyiv. After CSKA Kyiv was relegated to the Second League, Maksymov resigned.

Kryvbas Kryvyi Rih
In January 2010, he became manager of Kryvbas Kryvyi Rih.

Keşla
On 25 December 2017, Maksymov was appointed as manager of Keshla FK.

Career statistics

Club

International goals
Scores and results list Ukraine's goal tally first, score column indicates score after each Maksymov goal.

Honours

Player
Dynamo Kyiv
 Ukrainian Premier League: 1994, 1995, 1996
 Cup of Ukraine: 1996

Werder Bremen
 DFB-Pokal: 1998–99
 UEFA Intertoto Cup: 1998

Manager
Keşla
 Azerbaijan Cup: 2017–18

References

External links
 
 

1968 births
Living people
Sportspeople from Kherson
Soviet footballers
Ukrainian footballers
Association football midfielders
Ukraine international footballers
FC Borysfen Boryspil players
FC Systema-Boreks Borodianka players
FC Dynamo Kyiv players
FC Dynamo-2 Kyiv players
FC Krystal Kherson players
FC Rostov players
SC Tavriya Simferopol players
FC Dnipro players
FC Metalurh Zaporizhzhia players
SV Werder Bremen players
SV Waldhof Mannheim players
Soviet First League players
Soviet Second League players
Soviet Second League B players
Russian Premier League players
Ukrainian Premier League players
Ukrainian First League players
Bundesliga players
2. Bundesliga players
Ukrainian football managers
FC CSKA Kyiv managers
FC Obolon Kyiv managers
FC Kryvbas Kryvyi Rih managers
FC Metalurh Donetsk managers
FC Mordovia Saransk managers
FC Taraz managers
Shamakhi FK managers
FC Vorskla Poltava managers
Ukrainian Premier League managers
Ukrainian First League managers
Russian First League managers
Kazakhstan Premier League managers
Azerbaijan Premier League managers
Ukrainian people of Russian descent
Ukrainian expatriate footballers
Ukrainian expatriate football managers
Ukrainian expatriate sportspeople in Germany
Expatriate footballers in Germany
Ukrainian expatriate sportspeople in Russia
Expatriate footballers in Russia
Expatriate football managers in Russia
Ukrainian expatriate sportspeople in Belarus
Expatriate football managers in Belarus
Ukrainian expatriate sportspeople in Kazakhstan
Expatriate football managers in Kazakhstan
Ukrainian expatriate sportspeople in Azerbaijan
Expatriate football managers in Azerbaijan